Flat Witch Island, also known as Little Witch Island, is an island located close to the south-western coast of Tasmania, Australia. The  island is part of the Maatsuyker Islands Group, and comprises part of the Southwest National Park and the Tasmanian Wilderness World Heritage Site.

Fauna
The island is part of the Maatsuyker Island Group Important Bird Area, identified as such by BirdLife International because of its importance as a breeding site for seabirds. Recorded breeding seabird and wader species are the little penguin (400 pairs), short-tailed shearwater (500,000 pairs), fairy prion (10,000 pairs), common diving-petrel (100 pairs), Pacific gull, silver gull and sooty oystercatcher.  The swamp antechinus has been recorded.  Australian and New Zealand fur seals use a haul-out site on the south side of the island, and the latter species has bred there in small numbers.  The Tasmanian tree skink is present.

See also

 South East Cape
 South West Cape
 List of islands of Tasmania

References

Islands of South West Tasmania
Protected areas of Tasmania
Important Bird Areas of Tasmania